The Makula family was a Persian noble-family which was mostly active at Baghdad in the 11th-century. The family produced several prominent statesmen, who served as the vizier of the Buyid dynasty.

Sources
D. M. Dunlop. "Al-e Makula." Encyclopaedia Iranica. Ed. Ehsan Yarshater. Columbia University. Retrieved 27 January 2016.